Ian Bruce Crowden (born 22 February 1933) is an Australian former cricketer. He played eight first-class matches for Tasmania between 1961 and 1963.

His best batting and bowling performances came in the same match, against South Australia in Adelaide in 1962-63, when he took 5 for 49 in South Australia's only innings and made 52, the top score in Tasmania's second innings.

See also
 List of Tasmanian representative cricketers

References

External links

1933 births
Living people
Australian cricketers
Tasmania cricketers
Cricketers from Tasmania